Cadillac Muzik is an American Psychedelic Soul/Funk & Alternative Hip Hop band from San Antonio, Texas which specializes in music producing, live performance, & songwriting. The band is composed of San Antonio-based artists Beseja "CaddyMack" Moses and Scott "DaddyDvil" Campbell. Cadillac Muzik was inspired by Moses' uncle Jimmy Sampson, who was a member of Ohio Players. The collective sees themselves as modern-day leaders of new age soul, blazing a trail for new independent funk & soul music creatives to be recognized. 

Raised on the east and west side of San Antonio, Moses and Campbell got their start rapping with family members in the group THK (Texas Hard Knocks) in 2003 until ultimately finding their Southern hip-hop soul sound in 2010. They have released 18 albums, EP's and singles since 2012. According to San Antonio Express-News, Cadillac Muzik is one of San Antonio's most powerful black artists. Their music has played a major role in shaping the city's sound.

Music career

2014–2017 

In 2014, the band released FunkyLand.   The band released Vibration in 2016,  followed by Mind Play in 2017. Mind Play has charted #8 on the European Indie Top 200 Charts and number 40 on the DRT National Airplay Top 150 chart. Cadillac Muzik has also made appearances on San Antonio Current Magazine in May 2017, and Texas Public Radio in August 2017 as well.

2018–2020 

A pause in their release schedule ended in 2018 with Lac Gospel, which registered on Billboard's R&B Album Sales chart. Moses and Campbell quickly followed up the next year with Groove Nation. The EP hit several Billboard Magazine charts, including Heatseekers and Independent Albums. The band quickly peaked at #12 on the Billboard R&B Album Sales Charts for their project titled Lac Gospel. The following year in 2019, they ranked #10 for R&B Album Sales, #22 for Heatseekers Albums, and #45 for Independent Albums Sales for their project Groove Nation. In 2020, the band released 2 Albums/EPs titled Playa Innovators October 2020 the band quickly followed up the previous projects with another single titled Cerebral Celebration. The duo found their influences for this project from Houstonʼs UGK to alt-rappers A Tribe Called Quest, The Pharcyde, and the psychedelic funk collective Parliament Funkadelic. Ending the year in 2020, the band released a single titled "Gamble Love" which peaked at #86 on Cashbox Top 200 Airplay Charts and #5 on Cashbox Top 150 Independent Airplay Charts.

2021 

Cadillac Muzik produced their 5th independently released project titled "Stayin Alive." According to The Source, the sound is very reminiscent of 90s artists like D’Angelo, CeeLo Green, and Raphael Saadiq. According to People's Choice Awards, they were considered as one of the hottest artists to watch in 2021. May 2021, Cadillac Muzik's "Lac Gospel" album made the San Antonio Current list for 20 albums recorded in San Antonio that every music fan should know. May 14, 2021 Cadillac Muzik released their long-awaited EP "O.G. Style". The project was dedicated to their late eastside uncle Charles “Black Beamus” Williams. July 2021, The duo followed up the previous project with their single "SpaceCowboy", which was a collaboration with MoonShyne Brown.

2023 

Beseja “CaddyMack” Moses who is the lead singer, producer, and songwriter of the collective released “El Dorado Sky”.  This would make El Dorado Sky the first record the band had released since their last independently released song “SpaceCowboy”. February 22nd, Cadillac Muzik and Garrett "StarchildJr" Shider released "Brain UnChain.

Collaborations

In 2023, Beseja “CaddyMack” Moses of Cadillac Muzik & Garrett “Starchild Jr” Shider of Parliament-Funkadelic teamed up.  Moses, the nephew of Jimmy Sampson (Ohio Players Drummer) and Shider, the son of Garry Shider (P-Funk Lead Guitarist) fused Psychedelic funk and Modern Alternative R&B to create "Brain UnChain".

Discography

Albums
FunkyLand (2014)
Lac Gospel (2018)
Groove Nation (2019)
Playa Innovators (2020)
Stayin Alive (2021) 
O.G. Style (2021)

Singles
Vibration (2016)
Mind Play (2017)
Cerebral Celebration (2020)
Gamble Love (2020)
SpaceCowboy (2021)
El Dorado Sky (2023)
Brain UnChain (2023)

News and Magazine Appearances
San Antonio Current (May 2017)
Texas Public Radio (August 2017)
Cashbox (March 2017)
All Music (June 2019)
PR Newswire (May 2020)
Cashbox (December 2020)
PR Newswire (February 2021)
MarketWatch (February 2021)
San Antonio Express-News (February 2021)
The Source (February 2021)
AllHipHop (March 2021)
People's Choice Awards (March 2021)
San Antonio Express-News (March 2021)
PR Newswire (April 2021)
AllHipHop (May 2021)
San Antonio Current (May 2021)
Top40-Charts (July 2021)
Earmilk (July 2021)
Singersroom (August 2021)
LA Weekly (June 2022)
Singersroom (Jan 2023)
The Source (Feb 2023)

References

External links
Official Website

Living people
American hip hop singers
American hip hop record producers
Rappers from San Antonio
Rappers from Texas
Musicians from Texas
Southern hip hop musicians
African-American male rappers
Musicians from San Antonio
21st-century American rappers
Record producers from Texas
21st-century American male musicians
Year of birth missing (living people)
21st-century African-American musicians